The light heavyweight class in the boxing at the 1964 Summer Olympics competition was the second-heaviest class.  Light heavyweights were limited to those boxers weighing less than 81 kilograms. 19 boxers from 19 nations competed.

Medalists

Results

References

Sources

L